Cesar Cuellar (born March 1, 2003) is an American soccer player who plays as a midfielder for the Northern Illinois Huskies .

Career

Fort Lauderdale CF
Cuellar made his league debut for the club on August 8, 2020, coming on as a 59th-minute substitute for Felipe Valencia in a 2–1 away victory over Tormenta FC.

References

External links
Cesar Cuellar at US Soccer Development Academy
NIU bio
FIU bio
USL League Two bio

2003 births
Living people
Inter Miami CF II players
USL League One players
American soccer players
Soccer players from Florida
Association football midfielders
People from Homestead, Florida
American sportspeople of Salvadoran descent
Sportspeople from Miami-Dade County, Florida
FIU Panthers men's soccer players
Northern Illinois Huskies men's soccer players
USL League Two players